Maccabi Tzur Shalom is an Israeli football club based in the Tzur Shalom neighbourhood of Kiryat Bialik. The club plays in Liga Alef North, and played home matches at the Tzur Shalom Stadium in Kiryat Bialik.

History
The club played mostly in the lower divisions of Israeli football. However, they started a period of success after they won Liga Gimel Haifa division in the 1999–2000 season, and were promoted to Liga Bet. Two seasons later, in the 2001–02 season, they won Liga Bet North B division, and were promoted to Liga Alef, and three seasons later, in the 2004–05 season, they won Liga Alef North, and were promoted to Liga Artzit, the third tier of Israeli football at the time. However, their spell in Liga Artzit lasted one season, as they finished second bottom at the 2005–06 season with 7 wins out of 33 matches, and were relegated back to Liga Alef (now as third tier, following the closure of Liga Artzit in 2009), where they last played.

The club represented Israel at the 2009 UEFA Regions' Cup.

On 27 July 2020, they merged with Maccabi Ironi Kiryat Ata.

Honours
Liga Alef North
2004–05
Liga Bet North B
2001–02
Liga Gimel Haifa
1984–85, 1999–00

References

External links
Maccabi Tzur Shalom Israel Football Association 

Tzur Shalom
Tzur Shalom
Association football clubs established in 1972
1972 establishments in Israel